Ibrahim Badr El-Din Sayed (arإبراهيم بدر الدين السيد) (born 18 September 1927) is an Egyptian tennis player who represented Egypt in 17 matches in the Davis Cup between 1955 and 1962.

References

Egyptian male tennis players
1927 births
Living people